Refining Fires is a 1915 American silent short drama film directed by Tom Ricketts. The film stars Harry Van Meter, Charlotte Burton, Jean Durrell, Louise Lester, Jack Richardson, and Vivian Rich.

Cast
 Harry Van Meter as John Alstrom
 Vivian Rich as Mary
 Jack Richardson as Judge Stone
 Charlotte Burton as Nina - the judge's daughter
 Louise Lester as Sister Superior
 Jean Durrell
 Mrs.Tom Ricketts as Florence

External links

1915 films
1915 drama films
Silent American drama films
American silent short films
American black-and-white films
1915 short films
Films directed by Tom Ricketts
1910s American films
1910s English-language films
American drama short films